Cili may refer to:

Cili County
Cili, an effigy of Dewi Sri made from lontar palm leaves
Čili, restaurants